Bern (or Berne) is the capital of Switzerland.

Bern or Berne may also refer to:

Places

Germany
 Berne, Germany, a town in Lower Saxony
 Berne, Hamburg, former village which became a quarter of Hamburg

Italy
 Verona, Italy, a city called Bern in Middle High German

Netherlands
 Bern (Netherlands), a hamlet in Gelderland

Switzerland
 Canton of Bern, of which Bern is the capital
 Bern (district), the city's administrative district in the Canton of Bern

United States
 Bern, Idaho
 Berne, Indiana
 Berne, Iowa
 Bern, Kansas
 Berne, Michigan
 Berne, Minnesota
 Berne, New York
 Berne, Pennsylvania
 Bern Township, Pennsylvania
 Berne Township, Fairfield County, Ohio
 Bern, Wisconsin

People
 Bern, a nickname or short form for the given names Bernard, Bernadette, and Bernadine
 Zvi Bern (born 1960), American theoretical physicist
 Dietrich von Bern (454–526), the German name of Theodoric the Great), king of the Ostrogoths
 Eric Berne (1910–1970), Canadian psychiatrist
 Josef Berne (1904–1964), Russian-born American writer, film director and producer
 Suzanne Berne (born 1961), American novelist
 Tim Berne (born 1954), American jazz saxophonist and composer

Other uses
 Bern Convention (or Berne Convention), shorthand for the Berne Convention on the Conservation of European Wildlife and Natural Habitats, also known as the Bern Convention (or Berne Convention), a binding international legal instrument in the field of Nature Conservation
 Berne Convention, shorthand for the Berne Convention for the Protection of Literary and Artistic Works, an international agreement governing copyright

See also
 Berne (disambiguation)
 Bernie (disambiguation)
 Bernie (given name)
 Berny (disambiguation)
 Burn (disambiguation)